Dick Lau Siu-wai (born 20 December 1985 in Hong Kong) is a professional squash player who represents Hong Kong. He reached a career-high world ranking of World number 74.

References

External links 
 
 
 

1985 births
Living people
Hong Kong male squash players
Asian Games medalists in squash
Asian Games bronze medalists for Hong Kong
Squash players at the 2010 Asian Games
Competitors at the 2009 World Games
Medalists at the 2010 Asian Games